Sir Walter George Kent CBE (3 August 1858 – 11 November 1938) was a British businessman who was chairman and managing director of the engineering firm George Kent Ltd which was started by his father, George Kent, in 1838.  He was appointed a CBE in 1918 and was knighted in 1929 for political services; he was at the time chairman of the Luton Conservative Association.

Kent died following an operation during the Two-Minute Silence on Armistice Day, while in a Harrow nursing home.

References

1858 births
1938 deaths
People from Bloomsbury
Commanders of the Order of the British Empire
Knights Bachelor